Carl-Göran Ekerwald (born 30 December 1923) is a Swedish novelist, literary critic, forest worker and teacher. Among his works are the short story collection Kumminåkern from 1962, and Skogvaktarens pojke from 2002. He was awarded the Dobloug Prize in 1987.

References

1923 births
Living people
20th-century Swedish novelists
21st-century Swedish novelists
Dobloug Prize winners
Litteris et Artibus recipients
Swedish male novelists
20th-century Swedish male writers
21st-century male writers